The Tobacco Plains Indian Band (Ktunaxa: ʔakink̓umⱡasnuqⱡiʔit ) are a First Nation based in the East Kootenay region of British Columbia.  In the British Columbia Treaty Process They are part of the Ktunaxa Kinbasket Tribal Council.

Chief and Councillors
 Chief - Mary Mahseelah
 Councillor - Dan Gravelle
 Councillor - Robert Luke
 Councillor - Corey Letcher 
 Councillor - Jason Gravelle

Treaty Process

There are in Stage 4 of the BC Treaty Process.

History

Ktunaxa Ksanka - Who we are, we are Kootenay Nation, Tobacco Plains Indian Band.
There are 6 Kootenai nations and 1 Salish. Two from the United States of America Idaho, Montana, Grasmere BC, Creston BC, Cranbrook BC, Windermere BC, Invermere BC are the Shuswap Nation who are Salish that our Kootenay, Kootenai Nations adopted into our Nation.

Demographics

Economic Development

Social, Educational and Cultural Programs and Facilities

References

East Kootenay
Ktunaxa governments